Mats Ulrik Malm (born 10 May 1964) is a Swedish literary writer and translator. On 18 October 2018, Malm was elected a member of the Swedish Academy, on 26 April 2019 he was elected the new Permanent Secretary and Speaker of the Swedish Academy.

Mats Malm is a university professor of literary science at the University of Gothenburg. He has a PhD in Gothicism. As translator, he has published Icelandic Sagas. He is working on digitizing Swedish literature as director of the Swedish Literature Bank. Since 2012, Malm has been a member of the Royal Swedish Academy of Letters, History and Antiquities. On 18 October 2018, Malm was elected member of the Swedish Academy, where he succeeded Klas Östergren in Chair No. 11.

A man impersonating Malm rang the novelist John Banville on the day that the Swedish Academy intended to announce the recipients of the 2019 and 2018 Nobel Prizes in Literature. The man purporting to be Malm told Banville he had won and even read out the customary citation and asked if he would prefer to be designated the 2018 or 2019 laureate. Banville was attending a physiotherapy appointment at the time and was lying face down on a couch when the call came. He informed his daughter; she called her father back while watching the live announcement at midday to tell him his name had not been mentioned. After the announcement, a voicemail to Banville (again from the man posing as Malm) claimed the Swedish Academy had withdrawn his prize due a disagreement. Banville felt sorry for the man purporting to be Malm: "He certainly sounded upset, he was a very good actor". But he later compared the voice of the speaker to that of the real Malm, at which point he realised that neither man sounded alike. However, despite this, when Banville rang the number back he found himself in contact with the offices of the Swedish Academy.

Works
 Voluptuous Language and Poetic Ambivalence. The Example of Swedish Baroque, Peter Lang Verlag, Frankfurt am Main etc. 2011, .
 Minervas äpple: om diktsyn, tolkning och bildspråk inom nordisk göticism (1996)
 Textens auktoritet: de första svenska romanernas villkor (2001)
 Det liderliga språket: poetisk ambivalens i svensk "barock" (2004)
 Poesins röster: avlyssningar av äldre litteratur (2011)
 The Soul of Poetry Redefined: Vacillations of Mimesis from Aristotle to Romanticism (Copenhagen: Museum Tusculanum Press, 2012)

Translations 
 Gautreks saga (Samspråk, 1990)
 Gísla saga (Gísla saga Súrssonar) (Fabel, 1993)
 Carl Jonas Love Almqvist: Om François Rabelais' liv och skrifter (De vita et scriptis Francisci Rabelæsi) (Litteraturvetenskapliga institutionen, Gothenburg University, 1993)
 Snorri Sturluson: Snorres Edda (Prose Edda) (co-translated with Karl G. Johansson) (Fabel, 1997)
 Gunnlaugs saga ormstungu (Gunnlaugs saga Ormstungu) (Saga forlag Reykjavik, 2014)
 Hrafnkels saga (Hrafnkels saga Freygoða) (Saga förlag Reykjavik, 2014)

Awards
 Schückska Award of Swedish Academy 2010

References

External links
 Chair no. 11 - Mats Malm. Literary historian, Elected: 2018., biographical notes on Mats Malm at Svenska Akademien website
 Staff profile as professor, Universität Göteborg
 List of computer science publications by Mats Malm, dblp.org

1964 births
Living people
Members of the Royal Swedish Academy of Letters, History and Antiquities
Members of the Swedish Academy
Scandinavian studies scholars
Swedish literary historians
Swedish translators
Translators from Icelandic
Academic staff of the University of Gothenburg